Sager Lake is a lake in Martin County, in the U.S. state of Minnesota.

Sager Lake bears the name of an early settler.

References

Lakes of Minnesota
Lakes of Martin County, Minnesota